Nur County is in Mazandaran province, Iran. The capital of the county is the city of Nur. At the 2006 census, the county's population was 104,807 in 27,699 households. The following census in 2011 counted 109,281 people in 32,461 households. At the 2016 census, the county's population was 121,531 in 39,350 households.

Administrative divisions

The population history of Nur County's administrative divisions over three consecutive censuses is shown in the following table. The latest census shows three districts, nine rural districts, and five cities.

References

 

Counties of Mazandaran Province